Frank Dekkers (born 1961 in Nijmegen) is a Dutch painter of landscapes. He studied painting and graphics at the Utrecht School of the Arts. His work is influenced by artist Kees Bol, with whom he interned in 1984.

Dekkers makes aquarels, paintings and drawings on location and in particular near rivers. Based on his impressions, he creates woodcuts, lithographs and large paintings in his studio.

Museum exhibitions
 1991 - Taipei Fine Arts Museum, Taipei, Taiwan
 1993 - Ino-cho Paper Museum, Ino, Kōchi, Japan
 1996 - Ino-cho Paper Museum, Ino, Kōchi, Japan
 1998 - Singer Museum, Laren, Netherlands
 1999 - Museum The Old Town Hall, Leerdam, Netherlands
 2002 - City Museum, IJsselstein, Netherlands
 2005 - Municipal Museum, Vianen, Netherlands

Books and catalogues 
 1999 - De plek  (The place), with art by Dekkers and Jeroen Hermkens, and texts by Michael Martone.
 2001 - Frank Dekkers, with texts by Rimme Rypkema
 2006 - Aan de rivier (At the river), with poetry by Menno van der Beek, Mark Boog, Lenze Bouwers, Chrétien Breukers, and Abe de Vries
 2006 - Winterreise (Winter journey)
 2009 - Oorverdovend stil (Deafening stillness), with texts by Dick Adelaar, Bianca Ruiz, Christina Hosman and Jeroen Hermkens

References

External links

 Official website

1961 births
Living people
Dutch painters
Dutch male painters
People from Nijmegen
Utrecht School of the Arts alumni